The 2014 NCAA Division III Men's Ice Hockey Tournament was the culmination of the 2013–14 season, the 31st such tournament in NCAA history. It concluded with St. Norbert defeating Wisconsin–Stevens Point in the championship game 3-1. All First Round and Quarterfinal matchups were held at home team venues, while all succeeding games were played at the Androscoggin Bank Colisée in Lewiston, Maine.

For the first time since its inception in 1984, no team from ECAC West made the tournament.

Qualifying teams
The following teams qualified for the tournament. Automatic bids were offered to the conference tournament champion of seven different conferences. Four at-large bids were available for the highest-ranked non-automatic qualifiers (overall seed in parentheses).

Format
The tournament featured four rounds of play. All rounds were Single-game elimination. The top four ranked teams were arranged so that were they all to reach the national semifinal the first seed would play the fourth seed and the second seed would play the third seed.

Because the fifth- and sixth-ranked teams were both western schools, all four western teams were advanced to the quarterfinal round with the first western seed playing the fourth western seed and the second western seed playing the third western seed. With the remaining quarterfinal brackets made up entirely of eastern teams, they were matched according to their seedings. The first eastern team was advanced to the quarterfinal round, the second eastern seed played the seventh eastern seed, the third eastern seed played the sixth eastern seed and fourth eastern seed played the fifth eastern seed. The winner between the fourth- and fifth-seeded teams advanced to play the top eastern seed while the winner of the other two first round games met in the remaining quarterfinal match.

In the First Round and Quarterfinals the higher-seeded team served as host.

Tournament Bracket

Note: * denotes overtime period(s)

All-Tournament Team
G: David Jacobson (St. Norbert)
D: Marian Fiala (St. Norbert)
D: Kyle Brodie (Wisconsin–Stevens Point)
F: Joe Perry* (St. Norbert)
F: Joe Kalisz (Wisconsin–Stevens Point)
F: Shawn Hulshof (Oswego State)
* Most Outstanding Player(s)

Record by conference

References

External links
Division III Men's Ice Hockey Record Book

 
NCAA Division III ice hockey